The  is a Japanese freight-only industrial railway line between Hachinohe Freight Terminal and Kitanuma Station, all within Hachinohe, Aomori.

History
The Hachinohe Rinkai Railway began operations on March 25, 1966, to connect the Port of Hachinohe with a nearby Mitsubishi Paper Mill Ltd. factory. The line was funded and operated by the prefectural government of Aomori Prefecture. On December 1, 1970, in compliance with the Local Railways Law, operations of the line were turned over to the third sector . Transport of containers began in 1986.

Basic data
Distance: 
Gauge: 
Stations: 2
Double-tracked section: None
Electrification: None
Railway signalling: staff token

See also
List of railway companies in Japan
List of railway lines in Japan

References

 This article incorporates material translated from the corresponding article in the Japanese language Wikipedia

External links
 Hachinohe Rinkai Railway official website 

Railway lines in Japan
Rail transport in Aomori Prefecture
Railway lines opened in 1966
1067 mm gauge railways in Japan
Hachinohe